Walmer is a locality in the Shire of Mount Alexander, Victoria.

References